Calliope Iphegenia Torres, M.D. is a fictional character from the medical drama television series Grey's Anatomy, which airs on the ABC in the United States. The character was created by series' producer Shonda Rhimes, and is portrayed by Sara Ramirez. She was introduced in season 2, as a senior orthopedic resident, as a love-interest for intern George O'Malley (T. R. Knight). Eventually becoming an attending orthopedic surgeon, the character was originally contracted to appear on a recurring basis, but received star-billing in season 3.

Torres was initially conceived as a love-interest, and eventual wife, for O'Malley, and was created to be disliked by her colleagues. Further storylines include relationships between her and plastic surgeon Mark Sloan (Eric Dane), cardiothoracic surgeon Erica Hahn (Brooke Smith), as well as a marriage to pediatric surgeon Arizona Robbins (Jessica Capshaw). The character's bisexual storyline with Hahn and Robbins, and her development later in the series has garnered high critical acclaim. She is one of the longest-running LGBT characters in television history, appearing in 11 seasons and 239 episodes.

Ramirez's portrayal of Torres has been widely praised by television critics and the character gained significant popularity as the series progressed. Ramirez was nominated for several awards for their portrayal of Torres, including the Image Award for Outstanding Supporting Actress in a Drama Series, and the ALMA Award for Outstanding Actress in a Drama Television Series. The character was ranked at #7 by AfterEllen.com in the list of "Top 50 Favorite Female TV Characters." At the end of the show's twelfth season, Ramirez departed the show after 10 years, desiring to take a break.

Storylines
Callie Torres is introduced as an orthopedic surgery resident with a crush on intern George O'Malley (T. R. Knight). The two start a relationship and Torres moves into Meredith's house. Uneasy about the way their relationship is progressing, O'Malley confronts her, which results in her moving into a hotel. In the aftermath of the breakup, she meets and has a one-night stand with plastic surgeon Mark Sloan (Eric Dane), who becomes her friend. Torres and O'Malley subsequently reconcile, and the two marry in Las Vegas on the spur of the moment. Confused, O'Malley confides to fellow intern Izzie Stevens (Katherine Heigl), about his relationship woes over alcohol, leading to a drunken sexual encounter between the two. Torres remains unaware of his sexual encounter, but becomes increasingly suspicious, and announces her desire to conceive a child. Shortly thereafter, however, she discovers that O'Malley has been unfaithful, ending their marriage. Though her personal life is troubled, Torres thrives professionally when she is appointed as the hospital's Chief Resident. However, she soon begins struggling to cope in the role, and is demoted soon thereafter.

Torres forms a friendship with Erica Hahn (Brooke Smith), the hospital's new chief of cardiothoracic surgery. The two embark on a relationship when Hahn jokingly kisses Torres in an elevator to tease Sloan. Neither has been with another woman before, and Torres struggles with her bisexuality, and cheats on her with Sloan. She is initially forgiven, but after an argument about work, Hahn resigns from Seattle Grace, ending their relationship. New pediatric surgeon Arizona Robbins (Jessica Capshaw) kisses her, and they begin dating. Their relationship is tested when Torres comes out to her father, Carlos, who disowns her, cutting her off both financially and emotionally. When she is not granted a position as an attending, she publicly berates the chief, Richard Webber (James Pickens Jr.), and resigns from her post. She begins working at the neighboring Mercy West hospital, and when the two hospitals merge, she is promoted to an attending surgeon. Torres' father returns yet again, to condemn her, but ultimately accepts her sexuality. When Torres explains her desire to bear children, Robbins expresses disappointment, and their differing stances on the matter lead them to break up. Soon thereafter, a gunman commits mass murder at the hospital, and, relieved to have survived, Torres and Robbins reconcile, with Robbins agreeing that they should have children together.

When Robbins wins a prestigious grant to help treat children in Malawi, a disgruntled Torres agrees to move there with her, as the position will last for three years; however, her lack of enthusiasm causes Robbins to end their relationship and go without her. A heartbroken Torres moves in with Sloan, and they have a one-night stand. Robbins returns for Torres, apologizing and hoping for forgiveness, but Torres initially rebuffs her, and later reveals that she is pregnant with Sloan's baby. Robbins agrees to raise the child with her, but dislikes that Sloan will be a permanent part of their lives. En route for a weekend getaway, Robbins proposes to Torres, but before Torres can reply, the two are in a head-on collision with a truck, leaving Torres severely injured. In an attempt to save her life, obstetrician-gynecologist Addison Montgomery (Kate Walsh), delivers Torres's premature baby. Torres survives, and agrees to marry Robbins. After twelve weeks of recovery, both Torres and baby Sofia are discharged and allowed to leave the hospital. Torres recovers from her surgery, but deals with the backlash from her mother (Gina Gallego)'s attitude toward the wedding and her granddaughter. Torres and Robbins marry in a garden after the minister's wife falls ill, with general surgeon Miranda Bailey (Chandra Wilson), officiating the ceremony.

In the aftermath of a plane accident that killed Sloan and Lexie Grey (Chyler Leigh), Torres is forced to make the decision to have Alex Karev amputate Robbins's left leg to keep her alive, which puts strains on their relationship. The hospital is sued and eventually found guilty of negligence. Each victim, including Robbins, Derek Shepherd (Patrick Dempsey), Meredith Grey (Ellen Pompeo), and Cristina Yang (Sandra Oh) must receive $15 million of compensation, which leads the hospital to a near bankruptcy as the insurances refuse to pay. These doctors and Torres buy the hospital with the help of the Harper-Avery Foundation to prevent it from closing, and each become members of the new directing board. Everything seems to go well for Arizona and Callie, until a big storm hits the hospital, now named after Mark Sloan and Lexie Grey. In the last episode of the ninth season, Arizona cheats on Callie with Dr. Lauren Boswell (Hilarie Burton). Callie soon discovers Arizona's infidelity by seeing her wedding ring pinned to Dr. Boswell's scrub top. In the aftermath of discovery, both Callie and Arizona share their feelings and it is revealed that Arizona does not forgive Callie for making the call to amputate her leg. Callie is heartbroken and Arizona states that Callie lost nothing in the crash, to which Callie responds that she, apparently, lost Arizona.

Callie takes Sofia to live with Meredith and Derek, Zola, and baby Bailey for a while before kicking Arizona out of their apartment and celebrates by dancing in her underwear. Callie also left Arizona at therapy, telling her that she was the only one that needed to go. After being hit by a lawsuit, her father, Carlos, visits and tells Callie that he cheated on her mother but she took him back and Callie wouldn't be here if her mother didn't give Carlos a second chance. Callie goes to Arizona's apartment and invites her to come back home. Callie finds out during surgery that Arizona was sleeping with Leah, a second year resident, while separated. Although angry at Arizona, Callie still agrees to work things out.

After April's failed wedding to Matthew, Callie and Arizona bought a house together, a fresh start, away from the memories of their apartment. They later decided to try again for a second child. However, a trip to the OB/GYN led to the discovery that Callie had developed adhesions in her uterus in the years since Sofia's birth, meaning she could not carry anymore babies. After talking about it, the couple agreed to postpone their dream to have another baby until they're on more solid footing as a couple.

At the beginning of the eleventh season, Callie and Arizona gave therapy another chance in order to help mend their marriage. They were made to go 30 days living separate lives in the same house with no sexual activity with others or each other. They come close to breaking that rule and had to start over and before the 30 days was up they eventually gave in and connected sexually again. At the end of the 30 days at the final therapy session, Arizona realized she couldn't live without Callie; however Callie didn't feel the same and stated she felt suffocated and eventually walked out of therapy, ending their marriage.

Callie then goes on to date Penny, who was the resident in charge of Derek Shepherd's case. She comes to a dinner party hosted by Meredith, who recognizes her. It is then discovered that Penny is going to be working at Grey Sloan Memorial. When everyone, including Callie, finds out who Penny actually is, they protest and try to get her off of the Grey Sloan Memorial residency line. She manages to stay on the line, despite all the others' pleads and wishes.

After Callie discloses her desire to move to New York with Penny and take her and Arizona's daughter, Sofia, with her, Arizona takes Callie to court for sole parental custody. Callie eventually loses custody of her daughter to Arizona and breaks up with Penny, heartbroken, Penny moves to New York. After Arizona decides that both Sofia's moms deserve to be happy, Arizona presents Callie with plane tickets and offers a custody agreement that keeps Sofia in Seattle for the summer and then sharing her every other school year and Christmas.

Callie is referenced occasionally by Arizona and Sofia after her departure from the show.  At the conclusion of season 14, Arizona departs the show to move to New York and it is implied that the two reconciled after Callie and Penny had broken up.

Development

Casting & Creation

Ramirez's Broadway performance in Spamalot garnered the attention of ABC executives, and they offered Ramirez a role on any ABC television series. Ramirez chose Grey's Anatomy. Ramirez further explained that at their initial audition, the producers liked them and had intentions to add them to the show, but did not know as who. They also said that they were in awe of how the executives said, "Pick a show, any show", explaining that it is rare. Shonda Rhimes said: "I was looking for a girlfriend for George, but it was in the infancy stages, so I had no idea what I was looking for." Rhimes built the character around Ramirez after meeting them. Ramirez's character was initially given recurring status in the second season and received star billing in the third season, alongside fellow cast member Dane, who portrayed Mark Sloan. Ramirez discusses maintaining relationships with co-stars:

Characterization

The American Broadcasting Company (ABC) characterized Torres as "driven", "determined", and "outgoing", while also noting her weaknesses: "defensive" and "impulsive". Ramirez described their character as someone who "appears to be a certain way, but has some very complex issues going on behind the scenes. She seems to be a very strong personality, someone who really believes in herself and has worked very hard to get where she is. She's very competitive but does have a sense of self, so she doesn't need to win all the time." At Torres' initial appearance on the show, she was disliked by fans, due to her getting in the way of O'Malley and Meredith Grey's (Ellen Pompeo) relationship. When asked of this, Ramirez said: "You do run across a lot of people who are extremely invested in that storyline. Obviously, I've heard some negative stuff." The end of the show's fourth season saw Torres grow closer to cardiothoracic surgeon Erica Hahn, in a relationship referred to by the portmanteau "Eri-Cal" and later "Callica" by Michael Ausiello of Entertainment Weekly. Rhimes stated that: "Callie and Erica have an undeniable chemistry, and watching the story unfold is something the writers are looking forward to. I wanted to illuminate their relationship in the same way we do all relationships on the show — it will be funny, sweet, honest, and a little bit dirty."

She explained that in developing the relationship between the two: "we wanted it to be real – not some stunt to get people talking. We wanted to see what would happen if a woman suddenly had feelings for another woman." The two characters shared a kiss at the end of the season 4 finale, with which D. Williams of AfterEllen.com noted: "Callie and Erica became the only regular lesbian/bisexual female characters currently on network television. This is also the first time that 2 regular characters on a network show have begun a lesbian romance, as opposed to one becoming involved with a new lesbian character introduced expressly for that relationship." Before continuing with the storyline, the show's producers consulted with the Gay & Lesbian Alliance Against Defamation to ensure they maintained realism throughout. Trish Doolan, star of April's Shower was invited to consult in the workshop sessions which took place, and surmised that; "They were really wanting to be truthful to the 2 characters they're focusing on in the woman-woman relationship", with Nikki Weiss, who also consulted, adding: "they didn't want to stereotype anything either, and write from a place where they didn't understand it. ... I don't think they did it as a stunt to get people back to watching after the strike. I really think that they wanted to develop these two characters, and that you could see a closeness with them way before they ever decided any kind of — I think they just have a chemistry together, as actresses, too. You could tell that in the room. They definitely have a chemistry."

In the show's fifth season, Torres embarked on a relationship with Arizona Robbins (Capshaw). Fans refer to the relationship between the two by the portmanteau "Calzona" (for Callie + Arizona). Rhimes praised the chemistry between Callie and Arizona in contrast, comparing it to that between the show's primary couple Grey and Derek Shepherd (Patrick Dempsey), and stating: "They have that little thing that makes you want to watch them." In "An Honest Mistake", Torres was initially rejected by Robbins, with Robbins citing Torres' "inexperience" as a factor. Series writer Peter Nowalk offered the insight:

The couple ultimately decided to begin a relationship, however, the two experience difficulties, but eventually reunite. Rhimes commented on their reconciliation: "I love [Callie] with Arizona. ... I like that they make me feel hopeful about love." Rhimes has mentioned of their relationship in season 6: "I would like to see Callie happily in a long-term relationship. We have so much to explore with them, because we barely know anything about [Arizona]."

Callie and Arizona have a five-year relationship, ultimately marrying in season 7 and divorcing in season 11. Callie starts a new relationship with Penny Blake and leaves to go to New York with her in the season 12 finale. Shonda Rhimes spoke on Ramirez's abrupt departure, saying, "This one was different because it wasn't a big planned thing. I had a different plan going and when Sara came in and said, 'I really need to take this break,' I was lucky that we'd shot the end of the season with her going to New York."

Reception
{{quote box|width=25em|align=right|quote=What was truly revolutionary about Callie is that she was never defined by any single aspect of herself. She was curvy, Latina, and bisexual, and she was also a funny, frustrating, and lovable doctor with an amazing career and strong friendships. Callie was never expected to be perfect. She was allowed to be as messy as every other character on Grey's Anatomy, and, for everyone who identified with her as a whole or in part, it was a huge relief to see this woman who represented so many perspectives be allowed to just be awesome.|source= Sabienna Bowmna of Bustle}}

Maureen Ryan from the Chicago Tribune was critical about the character's initial development. Reviewing the season 3 premiere, she wrote the writers should give up on Callie explaining they have made her "far too obviously the "weird girl," but there's nothing underneath her brusque persona." Her marriage to O'Malley was well-received; Staci Krause of IGN wrote: "Their relationship has been a roller-coaster and it was nice to see this turn of events, as she really is a perfect contrast to George." Discussing the character in terms of her relationship with Hahn, Williams was largely positive, assessing that: "The storyline offered both the drama Grey's is known for and a truthfulness network television has rarely achieved when it comes to lesbian relationships." Trish Doolan and Nikki Weiss, invited by GLAAD to consult with Grey's Anatomy producers on the storyline, praised the effort put into researching the issue by the writers and actors involved, though were more negative on the scene which saw Hahn kiss Callie in an elevator in front of Mark Sloan. Weiss commented: "I just felt like, if they really cared about each other, I don't think they would do that as a stunt. That seemed a little, I don't know, forced. ... [It] was more like a conquest, like he could have [Hahn] too or something." LGBT website AfterEllen.com agreed with this view, criticizing the way the scene was edited so as to keep cutting to Sloan's point of view, as though "privileging the male-gaze." AfterEllen.com included Torres in their list of the Top 50 Lesbian & Bisexual Characters, ranking her at #6 and in their Top 50 Favorite Female TV Characters. The character was also listed in Wetpaints "10 Hottest TV Doctors on TV".

Commenting on Hahn's abrupt departure from the show, Dorothy Snarker, writing for AfterEllen.com, observed of Torres and Robbins' relationship: "I ... can't help but be wary of how the Grey's writers will handle this relationship. Jessica has proven lovely and likable in her brief screen-time so far. But it's not how the romance starts, but what happens next that really matters." Speaking of the musical episode, Nicole Golden of TV Fanatic called Ramirez's rendition of "Chasing Cars" "amazing" and referred to their performance in Kate Havnevik's "Grace" as "beautiful". Margaret Lyons of New York Magazine was happy with the evolution of Bailey and Torres' friendship in the first-half of season 9, calling it "the one bright-spot": "They joke, they tease each other, they offer sage love advice to one another, now that they're both on their second marriages." Ramirez was nominated for Outstanding Actress in a Drama Television Series at the Alma Awards, in 2007 and 2008. Also in 2007, at the 13th Screen Actors Guild Awards, Ramirez and the cast of Grey's Anatomy, were the recipients of the Award for Outstanding Performance by an Ensemble in a Drama Series. They and the cast were nominated for the same award, in 2008. In 2011, at the 42nd NAACP Image Awards, Ramirez was nominated for Outstanding Supporting Actress in a Drama Series. They were ranked at #7 in AfterEllen.com's list of "Top 50 Favorite Female TV Characters"

 Notes 

ReferencesSpecificGeneral'''

External links
 Callie Torres at ABC.com

Grey's Anatomy characters
Television characters introduced in 2006
Fictional bisexual females
Fictional female doctors
Fictional LGBT characters in television
Fictional surgeons
Female characters in television